InMe are an English rock band originally formed in Brentwood, Essex in 1996.

InMe have released seven studio albums, two EPs, one "bootleg" album, one best-of compilation, one live album, one live EP and an acoustic album. A DVD of the band's Overgrown Eden show at the Highbury Garage on 18 November 2010 was released via PledgeMusic as a part of the band's campaign for their fifth album The Pride. The band has had eight singles appear on the UK Top 100 Singles Chart. The band are open about the fact that they all have day jobs, and ask fans to support them financially.

History

Formation (1996–2000)
The group originally formed as Drowned in 1996 when many of the band were just 14 years old. The members of the band at that time were Dave McPherson as guitarist / vocalist, Joe Morgan as bassist / backing vocalist and Simon Taylor as drummer. They played several local venues, getting their first interviews and airplay on Brentwood-based radio station, Phoenix FM. They recorded many unreleased tracks such as "acid drop" and "apricot"  The band scored their break when a scout from MFN caught the end of one of their sets, whilst attending a gig to see another band. They signed with MFN in 2001, and changed their name to InMe to avoid confusion with Drowned, an American Christian rock band of the same name.

Overgrown Eden (2001–2003)
Overgrown Eden was released through Music for Nations in January 2003, after numerous delays. It reached No. 15 in the UK Albums Chart, and No. 1 in the UK Rock Albums Chart.

Four singles were released from Overgrown Eden.  These were "Underdose", "Firefly", "Crushed Like Fruit" and "Neptune", the first three of these being issued before the album. "Underdose" was released in July 2002 and entered the UK Singles Chart at No. 66. This was followed by "Firefly" in September which peaked at No. 43. "Crushed Like Fruit" appeared in January 2003, charting at No. 25. "Neptune" was the last single released from the album in April 2003, charting at No. 46, and was accompanied with a video featuring fans at a live gig.

Music for Nations went out of business during 2004, when they were absorbed into a parent company. During this time the rights for Overgrown Eden were lost, and because of this, the album was eventually re-released in June 2006 when those rights were re-obtained. InMe played Overgrown Eden in its entirety in two separate dates in November 2010 as a part of a greatest hits tour to support their "best-of" album Phoenix: The Best Of InMe. The London show was recorded and was initially intended to be released through Sony BMG as a part of a re-release of Overgrown Eden. The DVD was eventually released through Graphite Records in 2012 along with the band's 5th Album The Pride.

White Butterfly (2004–2005)
Their second album, White Butterfly, was released on 20 June 2005. It was released in two forms in the UK, a standard edition with thirteen tracks, and a limited edition with two bonus tracks "Every Whisper Aches" and "Angels with Snipers". The first single from White Butterfly was "Faster The Chase" in 2004, when the band were still with MFN. Before the release of the album, there was a leak where several tracks, due to be released for the first time on the album were downloaded. The first in-store single to be released on the new label was "7 Weeks" which reached No. 36 in the UK chart, whilst the second single, "So You Know", peaked at No. 33. The release of White Butterfly was sandwiched between a tour of the UK. White Butterfly was produced by Josh Abraham and Colin Richardson.

The band released a double A-side download single "White Butterfly" / "Safe In a Room" on 19 December 2005, with a five track live EP.

White Butterfly was played in its entirety at two of InMe's shows on their greatest hits tour in November 2010.

Caught: White Butterfly and Daydream Anonymous (2005–2007)
A live album, titled Caught: White Butterfly was recorded at the London Astoria in December 2005, and released in August 2006. The live DVD, White Butterfly Caught Live, which was released in October 2006. In 2006, Joe Morgan left the band following the end of the tour cycle for White Butterfly and went to study at university, being replaced by Dave's younger brother Greg McPherson.

In September 2007, InMe released their third album Daydream Anonymous. It charted in the UK at No. 71, making it the lowest charting InMe album to date. Daydream Anonymous featured thirteen tracks. "I Won't Let Go" was released as the only single. Daydream Anonymous was played in its entirety on two nights of InMe's greatest hits tour in December. It marked a shift in style towards a more technical, progressive and complex sound and exhibited a massive improvement in all members' technical abilities as instrumentalists.

Herald Moth (2008–2010)
Herald Moth was recorded at Chapel Studios and the band finished recording the album in February 2009. It was released on 14 September through Graphite Records, and peaked at No. 68 in the UK chart. The album's first single, "Single of the Weak", was released on 17 August.

Herald Moth was InMe's first album as a four piece band, following the addition of Ben Konstantinovic in 2008. The band toured extensively through Europe from early 2009 to 2010, and saw Konstantinovic leaving in October 2009, to be replaced by Gazz Marlow in February the following year.

A double A-side single "All Terrain Vehicle" / "Nova Armada" was released in June 2010, with an accompanying video for "Nova Armada". Marlow's first recording with the band was with him playing second guitar on an acoustic version of "Nova Armada". With Marlow operating exclusively as a guitarist for the time being, backing vocal duties remained solely with Greg McPherson. InMe went on a 20 date run of the UK (known as the "All Terrain Armada Tour") to promote the album, with support from Fei Comodo and Envy Of The State.

InMe played Herald Moth in its entirety at both the Firebug in Leicester and The Relentless Garage in London in December 2010. InMe also headlined the Strongbow Stage at the Sonisphere festival at Knebworth in July 2010, and appeared at the Summer Breeze Festival in Germany in August.

Phoenix: The Best of InMe (2010)
Their best of compilation album, Phoenix: The Best of InMe, included 15 tracks: three tracks from each of the band's four studio albums and three new recordings. The new tracks were recorded in June 2010, with Fei Comodo guitarist Mike Curtis producing. They were entitled "Saccharine Arcadia", "Thanks for Believing Me" and "Bury Me Deep Beneath Your Skin". The album was released on 27 September 2010.

The accompanying tour saw the band take up a four night residency at The Relentless Garage in London in November and December 2010, playing each of their four studio albums already released at that time in their entirety in consecutive weeks.

Overgrown Eden DVD release and The Pride (2010–2012)
Following the airing of Overgrown Eden at the Highbury Garage in November on the Phoenix tour, the show (which was filmed) is to be released on DVD through Sony BMG. In a recent interview with Live4guitar, InMe confirmed that this DVD should be released as part of the PledgeMusic Campaign, which launches in November 2011. The band made an appearance on the Bohemia Stage on Sunday 10 July at Sonisphere Knebworth.

As was frequently confirmed by Dave McPherson on social networking site Facebook as well as on the microblogging site Twitter, InMe planned to spend the early part of 2011 working on their fifth album, which was planned for release in February 2012. The album is to be supported by a PledgeMusic campaign launching on 25 November 2011. The album exhibits  a completely different sound to its predecessor Herald Moth and has been described was "euphoric, uplifting and very positive" both by Dave McPherson and lead guitarist Gazz Marlow in the buildup to the album's release. In November 2011 'A Great Man' was released as a free download single via Pledge Music.

The album was released on 19 February 2012, InMe released their fifth studio album The Pride. Their PledgeMusic campaign got 314% - a percentage of which went towards the charity The Alzheimer's Society. In the UK Albums Chart it reached No. 60, and also reached No. 8 on the UK indie chart.

InMe uploaded 'Pantheon', the first single from 'The Pride' in March 2012. It was uploaded onto YouTube following an exclusive release via the Big Cheese magazine website. A video for Moonlit Seabed, the second official single from the album, was shot in September–October 2012 and released via YouTube on 27 November. On 16 December 2012, InMe also released Medusa through their BandCamp page without any prior notice, which is an additional album that was home recorded as part of a PledgeMusic incentive.

Centiment debut album (2013–2014)
In 2013 the tech-metal band Centiment, featuring Dave McPherson, Greg McPherson and Gazz Marlow of InMe, with Neil Howard and Mark Shurety, released their debut single "Zero Tolerance". This was followed by the debut album Streets of Rage in 2014.

The Destinations EP and Triple Album (2014–2015)
In 2014 InMe released a 4 track EP titled The Destinations EP, first via PledgeMusic and later for general release. This was followed by a UK tour to promote the EP in May 2014, supported by The Red Paintings. The band has announced via social media that they are to release a new triple album beginning in 2015. The project is titled Trilogy and will consist of three albums. The first, a soft rock album, the second a melodic rock album, and the third a heavy metal album. The first, titled Trilogy: Dawn, was released on 4 May 2015, with the PledgeMusic campaign launching on 3 April. On 9 March, the band released the first song from the triple album to their fans, titled Trauma: Door Slam Crescendo.

Departure of Simon Taylor (2017)
On 13 October 2017, drummer Simon Taylor announced he was leaving InMe to focus on other ventures. On 10 November 2017, InMe announced that Tom Dalton would be joining as their new drummer.

InMe performed two shows with Scottish rockers Gun at the end of 2017, which were Dalton's first shows with the band.

Discontinuation of Trilogy, Jumpstart Hope and addition of John O'Keeffe (2018–present)
On 2 November 2018, InMe announced via social media that they would be releasing their 7th Studio album called Jumpstart Hope in 2019. In the same post InMe confirmed they would not be continuing with Trilogy.

On 22 July 2019, the band announced that they had added their long-time merch guy John O'Keeffe to the band as an additional rhythm guitarist.

Finishing 2018 with a UK tour alongside A and Wheatus, InMe started 2019 with a string of sold out UK headline dates and will be embarking on another headline UK tour in September 2019, ahead of their Jumpstart Hope album release.

On January 3, 2020, InMe released "Shame" on Spotify from their upcoming album Jumpstart Hope.

Jumpstart Hope was released on January 17, 2020, and reached #10 in the UK Rock Albums official chart. 

InMe announced via Facebook that Greg McPherson was leaving the band on July 6, 2021. 

InMe announced via Facebook that Mike Garrett had been announced as Greg McPherson's replacement on December 6, 2021.

Discography

Studio albums

Compilations

Live

Bootlegs

EPs

Singles

Notes

Timeline

References

External links
 

Musical groups established in 1996
Music in Essex
British alternative metal musical groups
Articles which contain graphical timelines
V2 Records artists
Music for Nations artists
Musical groups from Essex